Little leaf of brinjal or eggplant (Solanum melongena L.) is one of the most serious diseases of brinjal in the areas of its cultivation.

Control Measure

Infected plants must be controlled and burned.

Insecticides can be sprayed for vector control.

Crop rotation ensure death of disease-causing pathogen.

Use of disease resistant crops.

Spray of varavion at regular interval of 15 days.

Tetracycline antibiotic can also be used to treat the disease.

Overview
Little leaf of brinjal is known to cause heavy economic losses in India. As the name indicates, symptoms of the disease include shortening of the petioles and production of leaves which are much smaller in size. Petioles are so short that leaves seen to be glued to the stem. They become soft and glabrous and somewhat yellow in colour. Affected plants do not bear any flowers or fruits if infection is in early stages of plant growth. However, in cases of late season infections fruits may remain small, become hard and unfit for consumption or marketing. The disease is caused by a plant pathogenic mollicute, Phytoplasma (earlier known as mycoplasmalike organism or MLO) and is transmitted by the insect vector, Hishimonus phycitis which belongs to the group of leafhoppers.

Management of the insect vector by means of insecticides and cultivation of resistant varieties are the principal means of management of the disease. Newly formed leaves are further reduced in size.Little leaf of Brinjal It is caused by Mycoplasma, It's transmitted by Leaf-hopper.

Sources
 Azadvar Mehdi and Baranwal, V.K. (2012). Multilocus sequence analysis of phytoplasma associated with brinjal little leaf disease and its detection in Hishimonus phycitis in India. Phytopathogenic Mollicutes 2(1):15-21.
 Anjaneyulu, A. and Ramakrishnan, K. (1973). Host range of eggplant little leaf disease. Mysore Jour. Agr. Sci. 7:568-579.
 Chakrabarti, A.K. and Choudhury, B. (1975). Breeding brinjal resistant to little leaf disease. Proc. Ind. Nat. Sci. Acad. B 41:379-385.
 Kumar, J., Gunapati, S., Singh, S.P., Lalit, A., Sharma, N.C. and Tuli, R. (2012). First report of a Candidatus Phytoplasma asteris (16SrI group) associated with little leaf disease of Solanum melongena (brinjal) in India. New Disease Reports 26: 21.
 Mayee, C.D. and Kaur, C. (1975). Little leaf incidence in relation to the vector population in some varieties of brinjal. Indian Phytopath. 28: 93-94.
 Mitra, D.K. (1988). Little leaf disease of eggplant In: Mycoplasma Diseases of Crops: Basic and Applied Aspects (Maramorosch, K. and Raychaudhuri, S.P., Ed.). , Springer New York. 343-348.
 Mote, N.N. and Joi, M.B. (1979). Control of little leaf of brinjal by insecticides. Jour. Maharashtra Agr. Univ. 2: 72-73.
 Mote, N.N., Joi, M.B. and Sonone, H.N. (1976). Screening of brinjal varieties to the little leaf disease under natural field conditions. Jour. Maharashtra Agr. Univ. 1: 305-306.
 Sohi, A.S., Bindra, O.S. and Deal, G.S. (1974). Studies on the control of the brinjal little leaf disease and insect pests of brinjal. Indian Jour. Ent. 36:362-364.
 Thomas, K.M. and Krishnaswami (1939). Little leaf- A transmissible disease of brinjal. Proc. Indian Acad. Sci. B 10:201-202.
 Verma, R.K. and Dubey, G.S. (1976). Control of little leaf disease of brinjal: Chemotherapy and screening for resistance. Acta Bot. Indica 4:144-150.

Bacterial plant pathogens and diseases